Bird Rock is a rock formation and a small Pacific island west of Tomales Point in Marin County, California that is roughly .

A seabird colony, the island is covered with a layer of guano. Cormorants are common on the island, and ashy petrels were found breeding there in 1972.

See also

List of islands of California

References

Islands of Marin County, California
Islands of the San Francisco Bay Area
Islands of Northern California
Geology of Marin County, California
Uninhabited islands of California
Rock formations of California
Pacific islands of California